is a former Japanese football player.

Club career
Kobari was born in Itabashi, Tokyo on 12 June 1977. He joined the Verdy Kawasaki youth team in 1996. However he did not play much, less than Shinkichi Kikuchi and Kenji Honnami. He moved to Vissel Kobe in 2001 and Vegalta Sendai in 2002. At Vegalta, he competed with Daijiro Takakuwa for a position. He moved to the Japan Football League (JFL) club Tochigi SC in 2008. He played in all matches and the club was promoted to the J2 League. However, he played less often, in favor of Kunihiro Shibazaki, in late 2009. He moved to the JFL club Gainare Tottori in 2010. He played in all matches and the club won the championship and was promoted to the J2 League. He retired at the end of the 2014 season.

National team career
In August 1993, Kobari was selected by the Japan U-17 national team for the 1993 U-17 World Championship. He played full-time in all four matches. In June 1997, he was also selected by the Japan U-20 national team for the 1997 World Youth Championship. He played in the first match against Spain.

Club statistics

References

External links

 Gainare Tottori

1977 births
Living people
Association football people from Tokyo
Japanese footballers
Japan youth international footballers
J1 League players
J2 League players
J3 League players
Japan Football League players
Tokyo Verdy players
Vissel Kobe players
Vegalta Sendai players
Tochigi SC players
Gainare Tottori players
Association football goalkeepers